At the Earth's Core is a 1976 British-American fantasy-science fiction film produced by Britain's Amicus Productions.

The film was directed by Kevin Connor and stars Doug McClure, Peter Cushing and  Caroline Munro. It was filmed in Technicolor, and is based on the 1914 fantasy novel At the Earth's Core by Edgar Rice Burroughs, the first book of his Pellucidar series, in token of which the film is also known as Edgar Rice Burroughs' At the Earth's Core. The original music score was composed by Mike Vickers.

Plot
Dr. Abner Perry (Peter Cushing), a British Victorian scientist, and his US financier David Innes (Doug McClure) make a test run of their Iron Mole drilling machine in a Welsh mountain, but end up in a strange underground labyrinth ruled by a species of giant telepathic flying reptiles, the Mahars (Pterodactyls with parrot-like beaks), and full of prehistoric beasts and cavemen.

They are captured by the Mahars, who keep primitive humans as their slaves through mind control. David falls for the beautiful slave girl Princess Dia (Caroline Munro) but when she is chosen as a sacrificial victim in the Mahar city, David and Perry must rally the surviving human slaves to rebel and not only save her but also win their freedom.

Cast

 Doug McClure as David Innes
 Peter Cushing as Dr. Abner Perry
 Caroline Munro as Princess Dia
 Cy Grant as Ra
 Godfrey James as  Ghak the Hairy One
 Sean Lynch as Hoojah
 Keith Barron as Dowsett
 Helen Gill as Maisie
 Anthony Verner as Gadsby
 Robert Gillespie as Photographer
 Michael Crane as Jubal
 Bobby Parr as Sagoth Chief
 Andee Cromarty as Girl Slave

Production
The film was made following the success of The Land That Time Forgot.

Kevin Connor later recalled, "we tried to get the beasts bigger so as to interact better with the actors – more one on one. We had a somewhat bigger budget thanks to the success of ‘Land.’ The beasts were specially designed so that small stunt guys could work inside the suits in a crouched position and on all-fours. Needless to say it was very cramped and the stunt guys had to take frequent breathers. Some worked better than others – but we were experimenting and trying something different."

Release 
The film premiered at the Marble Arch Odeon in London on 15 July 1976.

Reception
The film was popular, becoming the 18th most profitable British film of 1976.

Amongst contemporary critics, however, The New York Times was not impressed: "All the money used to make 'At the Earth's Core' seems to have been spent on building monsters with parrotlike beaks that open, close, and emit a steady squawling as if someone were vacuuming next door. Close up, the monsters look like sections of rough concrete wall and the decision to film them in closeup is only one example of the total lack of talent or effort with which the picture is made...the movie is a kind of no-talent competition in which the acting, the script, the direction and the camera-work vie for last place." More recently, in more positive vein, BFI Screenonline said, "Extravagant, colourful and thoroughly preposterous, At the Earth's Core is utterly without pretension but has the exuberant charm of the best of its decade."

The film was featured in the season finale of the revived Mystery Science Theater 3000, the show's eleventh season overall, released on April 14, 2017, through Netflix.

Featured Animals
Homo habilis, or is it Paranthropus? (Sagoth): The furry servants of the Mahars who are lighter in build than a gorilla.
Inostrancevia
Koolasuchus (In the movie, A fire-breathing Amphibian)
Megacerops (identified by its synonym Brontotherium): Incorrectly having a pair of horns on its head and razor-sharp teeth.
Psittacosaurus
Rhamphorhynchus (Mahar): Incorrectly having a bird-like beak, dragon-like wings, and the size of an oversized Vulture.
Tanystropheus (Hydrophidian): Poster only

See also
 The People That Time Forgot (film)
 Journey to the Center of the Earth (1959 film)
 Journey to the Center of the Earth (2008 direct-to-video film) – A direct-to-DVD American film sharing similarities with this film

References

External links

 MGM – Official Site
 
 
 
 
 At the Earth's Core at BFI Screenonline

1976 films
1970s fantasy adventure films
1970s science fiction films
British fantasy adventure films
British science fiction films
Films based on American novels
1970s English-language films
American International Pictures films
Amicus Productions films
Films directed by Kevin Connor
Films set in the Victorian era
Films based on works by Edgar Rice Burroughs
Films set in Wales
Films shot at Pinewood Studios
Films about the Hollow Earth
Lost world films
Pellucidar
Travel to the Earth's center
British science fantasy films
Films about dinosaurs
English-language Welsh films
1970s British films